The golden julie (Julidochromis ornatus) is a species of cichlid endemic to Lake Tanganyika, being found only in the extreme northern and southern shorelines of the lake in rocky environs.  This species reaches a length of  TL.

See also
List of freshwater aquarium fish species

References

Golden julie
Fish described in 1898
Taxa named by George Albert Boulenger
Fish of Lake Tanganyika
Taxonomy articles created by Polbot